GF1 may refer to:

Space 
 1967 GF1, another name for the 3539 Weimar asteroid
 1981 GF1, another name for the 4243 Nankivell asteroid
 1999 GF1, another name for the 44574 Lavoratti asteroid
 Gaofen_1, a high resolution Chinese earth observation satellite

Science and technology 
 The symbol of the GATA1 (erythroid transcription factor) protein
 Gravis Ultrasound GF1, a sound card
 Panasonic Lumix DMC-GF1, a digital camera

Other
 Gemini Force One, a novel by Gerry Anderson and M. G. Harris